John Shillingford (died 1458), of Exeter and Shillingford, Devon, was an English politician.

He was a Member (MP) of the Parliament of England for Exeter in December 1421, 1431 and 1433. He was mayor of Exeter 1428–30, 1444–5, 1446–8. In 1447, he was involved in fundraising efforts to repair the Old Exe Bridge in Exeter. He secured the promise of a contribution from John Kemp, the Archbishop of York, from the estate of the late Henry Beaufort but he died before the contribution was received.

References

Year of birth missing
1458 deaths
English MPs December 1421
English MPs 1431
English MPs 1433
Members of the Parliament of England (pre-1707) for Exeter
Mayors of Exeter